The Congressional Caucus on North Macedonia and Macedonian Americans is a bi-cameral and bi-partisan group of members of Congress dedicated to maintaining and strengthening a positive and mutually beneficial relationship between the United States and North Macedonia.

Breakdown of current membership of the North Macedonia Caucus
 3 Republicans
 5 Democrats

Members of the Caucus
Members of the North Macedonia Caucus

Co-Chairs
since January 3, 2019
Brendan Boyle (D-PA)
Debbie Dingell (D-MI)
Steve Stivers (R-OH)

Representatives

Republican
Robert B. Aderholt (R-AL)
Adam Kinzinger (R-IL) Retiring at end of 117th Congress.
Chris Smith (R-NJ)
Mike Turner (R-OH)
Michael Waltz (R-FL)

previously in office
Curt Clawson (R-FL)
Paul Cook (R-CA)
Trent Franks (R-AZ)
Trey Radel (R-FL)
Marlin Stutzman (R-IN)
Patrick Tiberi (R-OH)
Dave Trott (R-MI)

Democrat
Gerald E. Connolly (D-VA)
Eddie Bernice Johnson (D-TX) Retiring at end of 117th Congress.
John Larson (D-CT)
Bill Pascrell (D-NJ)
Adam Smith (D-WA)

previously in office
Don Beyer (D-VA)
Madeleine Bordallo (Guam-at-Large)
John Conyers Jr. (D-MI)
Alcee Hastings (D-FL)
Dan Maffei (D-NY)
James Moran (D-VA)
Pete Visclosky (D-IN)

References

External links
 Congressional Member Organizations Telephone Directory 
 Congresswoman Candice S. Miller Statement on Starting Macedonia Caucus 
 The United Macedonian Diaspora 
 Foreign Policy: What's in a name? For Macedonia, everything. 
 Journal Gazette: Macedonian Caucus adds Stutzman 
 The Quincy Herald-Whig: Steadfast ally Macedonia deserves right to self-determination 
 MIC: First Macedonia Caucus in US Congress Formed 
 NATOSource: 54 members of Congress urge Obama to invite Macedonia into NATO 
 U.S. lawmakers urge White House to press NATO on Macedonia 
 Macedonia pushes NATO, EU membership 
 Congressman Pete Visclosky, Member of Macedonia Caucus 
 Congressman Bill Pascrell, Caucus Memberships 
 Enlargement: No Longer a NATO Priority? 

Caucuses of the United States Congress